Khairabad may refer to:

 Khairabad, Bangladesh
 Khairabad, Sitapur
 Khairabad, Mau
 Khairabad, Khyber Pakhtunkhwa, Pakistan
 Raminji, Gilgit-Baltistan, Pakistan
Khairabad, Badakhshan Province, Afghanistan
Khairabad, Faryab Province, Afghanistan

Iran
 Khairabad, Chaharmahal and Bakhtiari
 Khairabad Masjid, East Azerbaijan Province
 Khairabad, Meyaneh, East Azerbaijan Province
 Khairabad, Darab, Fars Province
 Khairabad, Kharameh, Fars Province
 Khairabad, Qir and Karzin, Fars Province
 Khairabad, Sarvestan, Fars Province
 Khairabad, Sepidan, Fars Province
 Khairabad, Shiraz, Fars Province
 Khairabad, Hamadan
 Khairabad, Isfahan
 Khairabad, Kerman
 Khairabad, Balvard, Sirjan County, Kerman Province
 Khairabad, Sharifabad, Sirjan County, Kerman Province
 Khairabad, Zarand, Kerman Province
 Khairabad, Kermanshah
 Khairabad, Khuzestan
 Khairabad, Kohgiluyeh and Boyer-Ahmad
 Khairabad, alternate name of Kheyrabad-e Naser, Kohgiluyeh and Boyer-Ahmad Province
 Khairabad, Kamyaran, Kurdistan Province
 Khairabad, Marivan, Kurdistan Province
 Khairabad, Sanandaj, Kurdistan Province
 Khairabad, Lorestan
 Khairabad, Markazi
 Khairabad, North Khorasan
 Khairabad, Razavi Khorasan
 Khairabad, South Khorasan (disambiguation)
 Kheyrabad, Yazd
 Khairabad, Zanjan

See also
 Kheyrabad (disambiguation)
 Khayrobod (disambiguation)